Miss World 1951, the 1st Miss World pageant, was held on the 27th of July 1951 at the Lyceum Ballroom in London, United Kingdom. The contest was originally intended to be a one-off event connected with the Festival of Britain. A total of 27 candidates competed for the inaugural Miss World title.

The winner was Kiki Håkansson from Sweden. She wore a bikini when being crowned, the only winner to ever do so.

Background
The decade of the 1950s began and Europe was just beginning to rise after World War II. In Britain, people slowly returned to normal. Herbert Morrison, a member of the British parliament, began planning the centennial celebration of the 1851 Great Exhibition. In the summer of 1951, the “Festival of Great Britain” was finally born and it was located in Central London, on the banks of the River Thames.

Planning of the pageant
The “Lyceum Ballroom”, located half a mile from the South Bank where the Festival of Great Britain was being held, belonged to Mecca Dancing. Being so close to the headquarters of the Festival of Great Britain, Mecca Dancing was asked by the event's organizers if they could contribute in any way to the Festival. Eric Morley was the Publicity Sales Manager of Mecca Dancing, responsible for finding innovative ideas for the Festival. He wanted to create some activity or event that would attract attention, not only to young people but to people of all ages. This is how he suggested creating an international beauty pageant and proposed it to the organizers. Morley’s suggestion was accepted and the planning of the first Miss World pageant was in full swing. He saw how Bikini fashion was popular and decided that the contest would show beautiful women wearing that tiny garment. Initially, the event would be called “Girl Bikini Contest of the Festival of Great Britain” but due to its international character and after the comment of some journalists, Morley decided to call it “Miss World” after making sure that name had not been previously used or patented.
The first Miss World contest would be held that summer of 1951, being one of the last events of the Festival of Great Britain.

Selection of participants
The first thing was to get that several countries could be interested and send a representative. Through Morley's contacts, he managed to send invitations to the United States, France, Belgium, Sweden, Denmark, Ireland, Germany, Finland, Switzerland, Holland, Turkey, and Japan. Morley spent hours writing letters and making phone calls looking for people to find candidates in those nations. From all of those countries, Morley received an affirmative answer from five of them but time was running out. Morley decided to make a casting call to recruit British contestants a few days before the final on July 24th, 1951 at the Lyceum Ballroom facilities. At the end, Morley managed to have a total of 24 contestants from all over the United Kingdom, plus a girl of Mexican origin who was studying in London and who would represent her native Mexico in the contest. With those twenty-four Britons and the six international beauties, Morley already had thirty women enrolled.

Results

Contestants
26 contestants competed for the first edition of Miss World

 - Lily Jacobson
 - Jacqueline Lemoine
 - Aileen P. Chase
 - Ann Rosemary West
 - Brenda Mee
 - Doreen Gaffney-Dawne
 - Elaine Pryce
 - Fay Cotton
 - Jean Sweeney
 - Jean Worthe
 - Laura Ellison-Davis
 - Margaret Mills
 - Margaret Morgan
 - Margaret Turner
 - Marlene Ann Dee
 - Mary McLaney
 - Maureen O'Neill
 - Nina Way
 - Norma Kitchen
 - Pat Cameron
 - Sidney June Walker
 - Sylvia Wren
 - Thelma Kerr
 - Margaret van Beer
 - Kiki Håkansson †
 - Annette Gibson

Notes

Debuts
 
 
 
 
 
 

 
  - Originally, there were 30 contestants competing in the pageant, but Mary Akroyd and two more married ladies decided not to show up due to their husbands’ objection to showing themselves wearing bikinis before the eyes of other men.

References

External links
 Miss World official website
 Miss World 1951

Miss World
1951 in London
1951 beauty pageants
Beauty pageants in the United Kingdom
July 1951 events in the United Kingdom